South Carolina Highway 314 (SC 314) is a  state highway in the U.S. state of South Carolina. The highway is essentially a connecting route between U.S. Route 15 (US 15) and US 176 in a rural part of Orangeburg County.

Route description
SC 314 begins at an intersection with US 15 (Bass Drive) west-southwest of Holly Hill, within Orangeburg County. It travels to the northeast and curves to the north-northeast. It then curves to the east and meets its eastern terminus, an intersection with US 176 (Old State Road).

Major intersections

See also

References

External links

SC 314 at Virginia Highways' South Carolina Highways Annex

314
Transportation in Orangeburg County, South Carolina